Petr Kozák (born 13 March 1965 in Prague) is a Czechoslovakian orienteering competitor. He won a gold medal in the short distance at the 1991 World Orienteering Championships.

References

1965 births
Living people
Czechoslovak orienteers
Male orienteers
Foot orienteers
World Orienteering Championships medalists
Sportspeople from Prague